Elisa Tovati born Elisa Touati is a French singer, actress and television personality.

Early years 
Elisa Tovati was born in 1976 to parents of Russo-Moroccan Jewish origins in Paris, France.  She showed interest in theatre early in her life, and her teenage years saw her co-presenting a French programme Y'a pas d'lézard.  Her co-star was Stéphane Tapie.

Film 
As the years went on, she featured in many telefilms such as Navarro, Highlander and Extrême Limite. Her singing career was to evolve as she was spotted during Roger Hanin's Soleil and the more crucial La Vérité si je mens ! 2 (2001) where she played the girlfriend of José Garcia.

In 2007 she starred in 99 Francs featuring Jean Dujardin and Vahina Giocante.

In late 2014 she became a contestant on the fifth season of TF1's Danse avec les Stars.

Singing career 
Her singing career began on the same year her last film hit the big screen. She compiled her first album whose name comes from her first ever song and single, making it to the Top 50 in the French Charts, Moi, je t'aime pour rien.  Her 2002 album, Ange Étrange was made possible by others in the music industry, namely: Rick Allison, Richard Seff, Patrick Bruel, Yaël Benzaquen and fellow musician Axelle Renoir. In 2011, she released her first album in six years Le syndrome de Peter Pan.

Personal life
In 2006, Tovati married Universal music producer Sébastien Saussez. The couple has two sons.

Discography

Albums

Singles

Others
2007: "Pour que tu sois libre (La rose Marie Claire)" (Leslie / Anggun / Jennifer Mc Cray / Natasha St Pier / Elisa Tovati / Julie Zenatti) (reached FRA #21)

Filmography

References

External links 

 

1976 births
Living people
French pop singers
French people of Russian descent
French people of Moroccan-Jewish descent
French film actresses
French television actresses
Cours Florent alumni
Participants in French reality television series
21st-century French singers
21st-century French women